The De Oude Emigrant was the first newspaper to appear in the Transvaal. It was first published on 15 October 1859 in Potchefstroom but lasted only two years before closing down after controversy about its content.

References

Newspapers established in 1859
Publications established in 1861
1859 establishments in South Africa
1861 disestablishments in South Africa
Defunct newspapers published in South Africa